Filiberto Petiti or Pettiti (1845 - 1924) was an Italian painter, active in Rome, painting landscapes.

Biography
He was born in Turin. He was inspired by Carlo Piacenza and frequented the Accademia Albertina. Among his works are La pesca nello stagno, Nella Maremma, La Spiaggia di Fiumicino, Nella Macchia di San Marino, Cavalli al beveraggio, Il Colosseo, All'aperto, Lavandaie, Libecci, and ''Scene d'inverno.

References

1845 births
1925 deaths
19th-century Italian painters
Italian male painters
20th-century Italian painters
Italian landscape painters
Painters from Rome
19th-century Italian male artists
20th-century Italian male artists